Offworld is the fourth vocal studio album (Seventh overall) by electronic rock project Celldweller, released on July 28, 2017. The album marks a temporary change of style for Celldweller, focusing on more emotional songwriting instead of the usual aggressive metal and electronic aspects found in his previous albums.

Production and release
In January 2017, Klayton announced on Instagram that he was working on a new album (originally titled Offworld: Vol. 01), and posting a short snippet of music. On March 27, Klayton tweeted that the new album was finished, which marks the shortest production time of any major Celldweller release.

The first song from the album, "The Great Divide" was released on June 29, and shortly after that, a cover of The Call's "Too Many Tears". The album was finally released on July 28, 2017, including five original songs, as well as remixes and covers from Klayton's various projects, all reworked to fit the style of the album.

Style
Talking about the inspiration for the album, Klayton stated:

Reception
Mike Bax of PureGrain Audio gave the album a positive review with a rating of 8.5 out of 10, saying: "If there is such a thing as singer/songwriter exploration within the genre of electronic EDM music - Offworld is a prime example of how to do it successfully."

Track listing

Charts

References

2017 albums
Celldweller albums